The World Carfree Network (WCN) is an international network that coordinates the actions of car-free advocates from around the world. It is the main hub of the global car-free movement. The World Carfree Network brings together roughly 90-member organisations and many more individuals dedicated to promoting alternatives to car dependence and automobile-based planning at the international level. Working to reduce the human impact on the natural environment while improving the quality of life for all are major goals.

History

The network grew out of the activities of Car Busters, an international organisation within the carfree movement founded in 1997. The name Car Busters continued to be used in its joined spelling for Carbusters Magazine. Carbusters Magazine celebrated ten years of existence in 2008.

The Towards Carfree Cities conference series is one of the principal activities every year in the network. The conference has been held so far eight times and on three different continents:

Towards Carfree Cities I: October 26-November 1, 1997 - Lyon, France
Towards Carfree Cities II: April 10–15, 2000 - Timișoara, Romania
Towards Carfree Cities III: March 17–22, 2003 - Prague, Czech Republic
Towards Carfree Cities IV: July 19–24, 2004 - Berlin, Germany
Towards Carfree Cities V: July 18–22, 2005 - Budapest, Hungary
Towards Carfree Cities VI: September 20–24, 2006 - Bogotá, Colombia
Towards Carfree Cities VII: August 27–31, 2007 - Istanbul, Turkey
Towards Carfree Cities VIII: June 16–20, 2008, Portland, Oregon, USA
Towards Carfree Cities IX: 28 June-1 July 2010, York, UK
Towards Carfree Cities X: 5–9 September 2011, Guadalajara, Mexico

Activities

The network runs many projects and activities. Some of these are run by the network's International Coordination Centre (ICC). Others are coordinated in a decentralised manner by network members. Others still, such as the Towards Carfree Cities conference series, function by consensus between a project coordinator at the ICC and one or more local partners.

 World Carfree News monthly e-bulletin
 Carbusters Magazine
 Car-Free Days coordination and resources
 Towards Carfree Cities conference series
 World Carfree Network Resource Centre
 Carfree Green Pages online directory
 International Youth Exchanges (on irregular basis)
 Ecotopia Biketour coordination assistance
 Visegrad Publications Project (Central Europe)
 Autoholics Anonymous (UK)
 Carfree_Network discussion list

Its International Coordination Centre is located in Prague, Czech Republic. See also list of car-free places.

See also
Carfree city

External links
World Carfree Network website
Carfree.com website

International environmental organizations
Car-free movement